The Battle of Golden Rock was fought between forces of the British and French East India Companies on 26 June 1753, during the Second Carnatic War.  French troops, assisted by Mysorean troops led by Monsieur Astruc, assaulted a British outpost near Trichinopoly, drawing the main British force defending Trichinopoly.  The British, commanded by Stringer Lawrence, were victorious.

References 

Battles of the Second Carnatic War
Battles involving the British East India Company
Sieges involving the British East India Company
Battles involving the French East India Company
French East India Company
Sieges involving the Indian kingdoms
Battle of Golden Rock
Battle of Golden Rock
1753 in India
History of Tiruchirappalli